Peter Pilkington, Baron Pilkington of Oxenford (5 September 1933 – 14 February 2011) was a British public school headmaster and a Conservative member of the House of Lords.

Education
Pilkington was educated at Dame Allan's School, Newcastle where he came to faith and developed both his love of scholarship and his combative personality. In 1952 he went up to Jesus College, Cambridge and read history, being influenced by Conservative-minded figures such as Maurice Cowling, Herbert Butterfield and Michael Oakeshott. He graduated in 1955, and took his MA in 1959.

Ecclesiastical career
Pilkington trained for ordination at Westcott House, Cambridge, and was ordained as a deacon in the Diocese of Derby in 1959, and as a priest the following year. He served for three years as curate at the historic parish church of All Saints', Bakewell during the incumbency of George Sinker.

He left parochial work to take up his first school chaplaincy position. In 1975 he was appointed an honorary canon of Canterbury Cathedral.

Educational career
In 1962 Pilkington became a schoolmaster at Eton College, teaching history, and a college chaplain. Later he became Conduct (senior chaplain), and for 10 years also served as Master in College, the housemaster of the scholars' house, until his resignation in 1975.

He was Headmaster of The King's School, Canterbury from 1975 to 1986.

His final appointment in education was the post of High Master of St Paul's School, London, from 1986 to 1992.

Retirement
Following his retirement from education Pilkington was appointed Chairman of the Broadcasting Complaints Commission, serving from 1992 to 1996.

In 1995, he was made a life peer as Baron Pilkington of Oxenford, of West Dowlish in the County of Somerset.

He also assisted in retirement as an honorary curate of St Mary's, Bourne Street, a prominent Anglo-Catholic church in Pimlico, where he served from 1992 to 2005.

Although his entire teaching career was spent in the private sector, Pilkington was a vociferous supporter of selective state education. During his retirement he served for several years as Chairman of the National Grammar Schools Association.

Personal life
In 1966 Pilkington married Helen Wilson, who predeceased him in 1997. He was survived by two daughters, Celia and Sarah Pilkington.

References

1933 births
2011 deaths
Politicians from Newcastle upon Tyne
Alumni of Jesus College, Cambridge
Conservative Party (UK) life peers
Headmasters of the King's School, Canterbury
High Masters of St Paul's School
Ordained peers
20th-century English Anglican priests
People educated at Dame Allan's School
Teachers at Eton College
Life peers created by Elizabeth II